Darya Poshteh (also Romanized as Daryā Poshteh; also known as Daryapushteh, and Daryāpushti) is a village in Sakht Sar Rural District, in the Central District of Ramsar County, Mazandaran Province, Iran. At the 2006 census, its population was 770, in 217 families.

References 

Populated places in Ramsar County